Many religious denominations emerged during the early-to-mid-17th century in England. Many of these were influenced by the radical changes brought on by the English Civil War, subsequent Execution of Charles I and the advent of the Commonwealth of England. This event led to a widespread discussion about how society should be structured.

Fifth Monarchists
Grindletonians
Muggletonians
Ranters
Quakers
Seekers

See also 
Anglicanism
Anglo-Catholicism
Brownists
Diggers
The Caroline Divines
Congregational church
English Baptists
English Dissenters
English Independents
English Presbyterianism
Gangraena
Levellers
Puritans

Further reading

English Civil War
History of Christianity in England
Denominations
17th-century Christianity